Llewellyn Leslie King (April 8, 1909 – c. July 2000) was a Canadian politician. He served in the Legislative Assembly of British Columbia from 1952 to 1953 in the electoral district of Fort George, a member of the Social Credit party.

References

1909 births
2000 deaths